Ghatiya Assembly constituency is one of the 230 assembly constituencies of Madhya Pradesh a central Indian state. Ghatiya is also part of Ujjain Lok Sabha constituency.

Members of Legislative Assembly
 1977: Gangaram Parmar, Janata Party
 1980: Nagulal Malviya, Bharatiya Janata Party
 1985: Avantika Prasad Marmat, Indian National Congress
 1990: Rameshwar Akhand, Bharatiya Janata Party
 1995: Rameshwar Akhand, Bharatiya Janata Party
 1998: Ramlal Malviya, Indian National Congress
 2003: Dr. Narayan Parmar, Bharatiya Janata Party
 2008: Ramlal Malviya, Indian National congress
 2013: Satish Malviya, Bhartiya Janta Party

See also
 Ujjain
 Ghatiya
 Ujjain (Lok Sabha constituency)

References

Assembly constituencies of Madhya Pradesh
Politics of Ujjain
Year of establishment missing